Gede may refer to the following places:

Gede, Kenya
Gede, Nadia, West Bengal, India
Gede railway station
Mount Gede, in Indonesia

Gede may also refer to:

 Gede (Haitian Vodou), the family of spirits (lwa) that embody death and fertility

See also

Gedi (disambiguation)